Thomas Gregory (1502–1536/40) was an English politician.

Gregory was a Member of the Parliament of England for Plympton Erle in 1529.

References

16th-century deaths
Members of the Parliament of England for Plympton Erle
English MPs 1529–1536
Year of birth uncertain
1502 births